Albert Ray Olpin (June 1, 1898 – March 7, 1983) was president of the University of Utah from 1946 to 1964. During his presidency the university quadrupled in size and enrollment tripled from 4,000 to 12,000 students. To accommodate these new pupils, new programmes such as Nursing and Fine Arts were organised.

Biography
Olpin was the eldest son of eight children and was raised in Pleasant Grove, Utah. He was accepted into the Brigham Young University business school at 16 years of age, but left school a year later to serve a four-year mission in Japan for the Church of Jesus Christ of Latter-day Saints. When Olpin returned he switched majors and graduated from Brigham Young University with bachelor's degrees in mathematics and physics in 1923. In 1930 he received a Ph.D. in physics from Columbia University. He then worked at Bell Laboratories where he conducted research that led to the first television broadcast. He directed research departments at Kendall Mills in North Carolina and at Ohio State University. On October 16, 1946, he became the seventh president of the University of Utah, continuing as such until his retirement in 1964, at which time he accepted the title of "President Emeritus" and continued working with the university as a consultant.

He also worked on the Manhattan project that developed the first atomic bomb, and then helped in efforts to rebuild Japan after World War II.

Olpin died in Salt Lake City on March 7, 1983.

University growth
Many of the buildings on campus today were built under President Olpin's administration. Olpin started a 10-year building program in which 30 buildings were completed, including the Milton Bennion Hall, the Merrill Engineering Building, and the A. Ray Olpin Union Building. Olpin worked to resolve challenges less frequently faced by larger, more established institutions, including defending academic freedom and educating local politicians about the potential for the University of Utah to become the state's flagship university.

References

1898 births
1983 deaths
Brigham Young University alumni
Columbia Graduate School of Arts and Sciences alumni
American Latter Day Saints
Scientists at Bell Labs
American Mormon missionaries in Japan
Presidents of the University of Utah
20th-century Mormon missionaries
Fellows of the American Physical Society